Cal State San Marcos is an elevated railway station in San Marcos, California which opened in 2008. It is the only elevated station along the North County Transit District's SPRINTER light rail line. The station serves the California State University, San Marcos campus, which is located southwest of the station. It sits on an entirely new alignment of the San Diego Northern Railway's Escondido Branch that crosses over State Route 78 to serve the campus. On campus days, shuttle services are available to ferry students from the train station to the heart of the CSUSM campus and vice versa.

Platforms and tracks

References

External links
SPRINTER Stations

North County Transit District stations
Railway stations in the United States opened in 2008
Railway stations in California at university and college campuses
San Marcos, California
2008 establishments in California
California State University